Tayabamba or Tayapampa (Quechua taya a kind of plant, pampa a large plain) is one of thirteen districts of the province Pataz in Peru.

References